The election to the fourth Senate of South Africa took place on November 17, 1939, when the Provincial Councils met to each elect eight members of the Senate. After the election and the appointment of eight more Senators by Governor-General Sir Patrick Duncan, the Senate was left with a pro-war majority. There were 24 pro-government Senators (20 United Party including 7 nominated members, 2 Dominion Party and 2 Labour Party) and 16 opposition Senators (10 supporters of General Hertzog including one nominated member, and 6 Purified National Party). The four Native Representative Senators were also pro-war.

After the South African general election of 1948, a Reunited National Party-Afrikaner Party coalition came to power, with minority support in the Senate. The new government used the Senate dissolution power to trigger a new election to the body, which occurred July 28, 1948.

Bibliography 

General elections in South Africa
1939 elections in Africa
1939 in South Africa
1939 elections in South Africa